Leipzig/Halle Airport is a railway station serving Leipzig/Halle Airport, located in Schkeuditz, Germany. The station was opened on 30 June 2003 and is located on the Erfurt–Leipzig/Halle high-speed railway. The train services are operated by Deutsche Bahn.

Since December 2013 the station is served by the S-Bahn Mitteldeutschland.

Train services
DB Fernverkehr and S-Bahn Mitteldeutschland services currently call at the station.

References

External links

Airport railway stations in Germany
Railway stations in Saxony
Schkeuditz
Buildings and structures in Nordsachsen
Railway stations in Germany opened in 2003